Commius is a genus of shield bugs in the tribe Diemeniini.

References

External links 

 Commius at Atlas of Living Australia

Pentatomidae genera
Diemeniini